Strathallan is a locality in the Goulburn Valley region of Victoria, Australia.

The "Strathallan" property was located on the Cornelia Creek Estate when the latter was acquired for closer settlement in 1910-11, following the acquisition of the Restdown Estate on the other side of the Campaspe River in 1906. Small rural communities developed on each estate, separated by the river. A new township of Strathallan was surveyed around a new railway siding on the Echuca railway line, and the first lots were sold in December 1912. A bridge over the Campaspe River, along with two smaller bridges over adjacent billabongs, opened in 1913 following a prolonged dispute between the Closer Settlement Board and Shire of Rochester over its cost.

Strathallan State School opened in 1914 and closed  1969. A railway station opened in the same year; it has now closed. A postal receiving office opened in November 1913, was upgraded to a post office in June 1915 and closed in November 1967. Strathallan Public Hall opened in 1929 and remains in use today.

References

External links

Towns in Victoria (Australia)